Morales is a fictional character from the horror drama television series The Walking Dead, which airs on AMC in the United States and is based on the comic book series of the same name. He was created by series developer Frank Darabont and was portrayed by Juan Pareja. Morales is an original character in the television series and has no counterpart in the comics. The character was first introduced in the first season as a member of the group that series protagonist Rick Grimes encounters in Atlanta.  After a long absence in the series, Morales briefly returns in the eighth season as a member of the Saviors.

Character biography
Little background is given about Morales prior to the walker epidemic, including his first name, although he is initially shown in the Atlanta survivor camp with his wife Miranda (Viviana Chavez), and their two young children, Eliza (Maddie Lomax) and Louis (Noah Lomax).  After the first season, Morales is not seen again until season eight.

Season 1

In the episode "Guts", Morales is one of a number of survivors who have come to Atlanta to scavenge for supplies. On the roof of the department store in which they have holed up, Merle Dixon, a virulent racist, attempts to assert his leadership over the group and insults Morales before beating T-Dog. Rick Grimes subdues Merle and handcuffs him to a pipe, leaving him under the watch of T-Dog while the rest of the group look for a way out. Morales helps cover Rick and Glenn with walker guts so that they can walk through a crowd of walkers to obtain a truck and the entire group (other than Merle) is able to escape the city in the box truck. In the episode "Tell It to the Frogs", Morales and the group return to the camp, where he reunites with his family, and Merle's brother Daryl becomes enraged to hear that his brother was abandoned. In the episode "Vatos", at dinner, Morales asks Dale about the watch he always carries, even though the world has ended.  Soon after, the camp is overrun by a horde of walkers and Morales helps to fight them off. In the episode "Wildfire", Morales helps the group clean up after the attack. When the survivors decide to go to the CDC, the Moraleses decide to try their luck locating relatives in Birmingham, Alabama. Rick gives them some of the group's weapons and supplies.

Season 8

In the episode "The Damned", Rick attacks an outpost of the Saviors, and becomes devastated when he finds a sleeping infant in the outpost. Shortly afterwards he finds a picture of Miranda Morales and is shocked to be confronted from behind by Morales, now a hardened survivor and Savior lieutenant.

In the following episode "Monsters", Morales is shocked to learn that the Rick from Alexandria is in fact "Officer Friendly" as Morales knew him. Morales reveals that his family never made it to Birmingham and he lost his wife and two kids trying. Losing his family caused Morales to lose his mind and lose the will to live until he was found by the Saviors and inducted into their ranks. Despite Rick's attempts to talk Morales down, he is too far gone to listen and is now loyal to Negan beyond any loyalty he once had for Rick. Before the situation can escalate, Daryl Dixon enters and kills Morales with a crossbow bolt to the head. Though Daryl remembers Morales as well, he has no remorse for killing the man and quickly moves on.

Development and reception
Juan Gabriel Pareja was cast in the supporting role of Morales for the first season of The Walking Dead, which premiered in 2010. Leonard Pierce of The A.V. Club reviewed "Guts", the episode which introduced Morales, and noted that "Few of the scavenger group are especially well-drawn as characters", referring to Morales as a "cypher". Leonard Pierce of The A.V. Club reviewed the episode "Wildfire", and commented that "Morales and his family decide to peel off on their own and head to Alabama, in a nice scene that nonetheless makes you wonder why they were introduced in the first place." Eric Goldman of IGN commented that "It was hard to feel much about the one family deciding not to go with everyone when they left the camp – Honestly, I couldn't tell you any of their names, and only the husband had any screen time of note."

Matt Fowler of IGN reviewed the season eight episode "The Damned", and commented that he "really dug the Morales twist right at the end. In fact, some of the best elements of "The Damned" involved how much it actually strayed from the comics". Forbes' Eric Kain commented that "Rick is eventually waylaid by a character we haven't seen since a long, long time ago. Morales (Juan Gabriel Pareja) is apparently a Savior now" and that the one thing he liked about the episode "was when Rick finds a baby after just killing a guy outside the baby's room. This stops him in his tracks and makes him realize that the Saviors aren't just monsters, but are also parents with children and families. That hard truth is compounded by the sudden reappearance of Morales."

References

Fictional Hispanic and Latino American people
Television characters introduced in 2010
The Walking Dead (franchise) characters
The Walking Dead (TV series)